Horilka  is a Ukrainian alcoholic beverage. 

The word horilka may also be used in a generic sense in the Ukrainian language to mean vodka or other strong spirits and etymologically is similar to the Ukrainian word for burning - hority. Home-distilled horilka, moonshine, is called samohon (literally 'self-distillate' or 'self-run' - almost identical to the Russian and ). Horilka is usually distilled from grain (usually wheat or rye), though it can, exceptionally, also be distilled from potatoes, honey, sugar beets etc. One type of horilka, called pertsivka, is horilka with chili peppers. Historically, outside Ukraine, pertsivka is generally referred to when people speak of horilka, although pertsivka itself is just one type of horilka.

It is believed that horilka was not as strong as today with about 20 percent alcohol by volume (40 proof). However, today nearly all industrially produced horilka is 40 percent (80 proof).

Derivatives 
Ukrainian tradition has also produced various derivatives of horilka.  Some of these are available as commercial products, but most are typically home-made. This includes various kinds of fruit infusion, nalyvka and spiced spotykach: malynivka made with raspberries, tertukha (strawberries), agrusivka (gooseberries), ternivka (blackthorn berries), kalynivka (snowball tree), shypshynnyk (rose hips), horobynivka (ashberries), zubrivka (bison grass), vyshnyak or vyshnivka from cherries, slyv”yanka (plums), morelivka (apricots), tsytrynivka (lemons), mokrukha (oranges and cloves), mochena (citrus rind), kontabas (blackcurrant buds).  Horikhivka is flavoured with nuts. Horilka is also made with honey (called Medova), mint, or even milk.  In some cases  whole fruits of red peppers (capsicum) are put into the bottle, turning horilka into a sort of bitters; it is then named horilka z pertsem, or pertsivka.  (One should be mindful of the usage: horilka z pertsem refers to horilka bottled with hot chilli peppers, whereas pertsivka typically refers to horilka spiced with the essence of pepper.  Horilka z pertsem always refers to a Ukrainian spirit, whereas  Pertsivka or Pertsovka may refer to Russian vodka.) Medova z pertsem is the combination of horilka with chili peppers and honey.

Most of these preparations are aged with fruit for several weeks or months, then strained or decanted. Some recipes call for the jars to be placed on the rooftop, for maximum bleaching by the sun.  Many include the addition of home-made syrup for a strong liqueur, others yield very dry, clear spirit.  Some involve the fermentation of fruit as well as addition of horilka.  Preparations which are baked in an oven, in a pot sealed with bread dough, are called zapikanka, varenukha or palynka.

Traditions
Horilka plays a role in traditional weddings in Ukraine.

And bring us a lot of horilka, but not of that fancy kind with raisins, or with any other such things — bring us horilka of the purest kind, give us that demon drink that makes us merry, playful and wild!

—Taras Bulba, by Nikolai Gogol

Etymology 
The word horilka is attested in 1562 (горилка) and 1678 (горѣлка). Dialectic variants are harilka, horilash, horilytsya, horilets’, horilukha, z·horivka, zorivka, orilka, as well as Western Ukrainian horivka, horychka.

The word comes from the same root as the verb hority, ‘to burn’, similarly to Belarusian harelka, south Russian gorelka, Czech kořalka, and Slovak goralka, goržolka. It is considered to have come about following the Polish example gorzałka, possibly as an abbreviation of a compound word like horile vyno (‘burning wine’; compare the older word horěloe vyno, горѣлое вино, attested in 1511) or horila(ya) voda (‘burning water’; compare early Czech pálená voda → pálenka or Hungarian/Transylvanian palinka).  It may be an adaptation of the early Old High German der brannte Wein → Branntwein.  Also compare English brandy, short for brandywine, from Dutch brandewijn, ‘burning wine’.

Pertsivka
A pertsivka or horilka z pertsem is the most widely associated type of horilka outside of Ukraine. It is made with whole fruits of capsicum put into the bottle, turning horilka into a sort of bitters. Sometimes perstsivka can be made also using honey, which is then called pertsivka z medom or medova z pertsem (honey-pepper flavoured horilka). 
Nemiroff is a Ukrainian brand actively promoting pepper horilka worldwide through the heavy use of product placement in cinema. The brand and company don't have long traditions but pertsivka production itself does.

Production of Horilka

Horilka that is bottled and sold by companies is usually distilled from wheat or rye. Horilka may also contain honey or be distilled from honey, or contain chili peppers, mint or birch bud. 
The self-distilled alcoholic beverage is called samohon (literally "self-run", "self-steered") and is the homemade variety of horilka, akin to moonshine.

Brands
Hetman (brand)
Khlibnyi Dar
Khortytsia
Kozatska Rada
Nemiroff
Vozdukh (brand)

References

External links

Ukrainian Alcoholic Beverages

Ukrainian distilled drinks
 
Ukrainian alcoholic drinks